The Punjab Reorganisation Act was passed by the  Indian Parliament on 18 September 1966, dissolving the former state of East Punjab. Out of the former East Punjab, the modern state of Punjab was created, the new state of Haryana was created; territory was transferred to Himachal Pradesh, then a Union territory; and the city of Chandigarh became a temporary Union territory to serve as the provisional capital of both the Punjab and Haryana. This separation was the result of the Punjabi Suba movement, which agitated for the creation of a Punjabi-speaking state (the modern state of Punjab); in the process a majority Hindi-speaking state was created (effectively, Haryana).

References

Acts of the Parliament of India 1966
Reorganisation of Indian states